Skamania, a Chinookan word meaning swift water, may refer to:
Skamania County, Washington, USA
Skamania, Washington, USA